Claude Elzy Berry (February 14, 1880 – February 1, 1974), born in Losantville, Indiana, was a catcher for the Chicago White Sox (1904), Philadelphia Athletics (1906–07) and Pittsburgh Rebels (1914–15).

In 5 seasons he played in 245 Games and had 753 At Bats, 72 Runs, 165 Hits, 31 Doubles, 10 Triples, 3 Home Runs, 65 RBI, 14 Stolen Bases, 60 Walks, .219 Batting Average, .279 On-base percentage, .299 Slugging Percentage, 225 Total Bases and 30 Sacrifice Hits.

He died in Richmond, Indiana at the age of 93.

External links

1880 births
1974 deaths
Major League Baseball catchers
Chicago White Sox players
Philadelphia Athletics players
Pittsburgh Rebels players
Baseball players from Indiana
Sportspeople from Richmond, Indiana
Dallas Griffins players
Dallas Giants players
Indianapolis Indians players
Louisville Colonels (minor league) players
Cedar Rapids Rabbits players
Fort Worth Panthers players
Williamsport Millionaires players
San Francisco Seals (baseball) players
Portland Beavers players
Kansas City Blues (baseball) players